Svenska Cupen 1951 was the eleventh season of the main Swedish football Cup. The competition was concluded on 22 July 1951 with the Final, held at Råsunda Stadium, Solna in Stockholms län. Malmö FF won 2-1 against Djurgårdens IF before an attendance of 20,267 spectators.

Preliminary round

For other results see SFS-Bolletinen - Matcher i Svenska Cupen.

First round

For other results see SFS-Bolletinen - Matcher i Svenska Cupen.

Second round
The 8 matches in this round were played between 29 June and 1 July 1951.

Quarter-finals
The 4 matches in this round were played on 8 July 1951.

Semi-finals
The semi-finals in this round were played on 15 July 1951.

Final
The final was played on 22 July 1951 at the Råsunda Stadium.

Footnotes

References 

1951
Cup
Sweden